Ronald Santanna Rodrigues (born 5 February 1997), simply known as Ronald, is a Brazilian footballer who plays as a winger for Botafogo.

Club career
Born in Bom Jesus do Itabapoana, Rio de Janeiro, Ronald was an Internacional youth graduate. He made his first team debut on 27 January 2018, coming on as a late substitute for Marcinho in a 3–0 Campeonato Gaúcho home win over Avenida.

On 31 August 2018, Ronald moved abroad and joined Portuguese side Boavista. However, he only featured for the B-side before returning to his home country on 20 May 2019, after signing for Botafogo-SP.

A regular starter for the Pantera, Ronald moved to Botafogo on 20 February 2021. Regularly used, he suffered an ankle injury in July, being sidelined for the remainder of the campaign, which ended in promotion.

Career statistics

Honours
Botafogo
Campeonato Brasileiro Série B: 2021

References

External links
 Botafogo profile 

1997 births
Living people
Sportspeople from Rio de Janeiro (state)
Brazilian footballers
Association football forwards
Campeonato Brasileiro Série B players
Sport Club Internacional players
Botafogo Futebol Clube (SP) players
Botafogo de Futebol e Regatas players
Boavista F.C. players
Brazilian expatriate footballers
Brazilian expatriate sportspeople in Portugal
Expatriate footballers in Portugal